Kayleth is a first person adventure video game for the Commodore 64 and the ZX Spectrum that was developed and published by Adventure Soft.  The game has cyberpunk, sci fi and photo adventure elements.

Gameplay

Players must use clues to change their playing methods during the game which involves figuring out an escape from their space cruiser (Kormar) in search for Kayleth.

References

External links
Kayleth (World of Spectrum)
Kayleth (Moby Games)
Kayleth (ZZap64 Magazine)

Commodore 64 games
ZX Spectrum games
1986 video games
Adventure games
Science fiction video games
U.S. Gold games
Video games developed in the United Kingdom
Adventure Soft games